Parliamentary elections were held in Chad on 8 July 1990. They were the first elections since 1969 and followed a referendum the previous year which had made the country a one-party state, with the National Union for Independence and Revolution as the sole legal party. However, all 436 candidates stood for election as independents. Voter turnout was 56.06%.

Results

References

Parliamentary election
Elections in Chad
Non-partisan elections
Chad
Chad
Election and referendum articles with incomplete results